Verve may refer to:

Music
 The Verve, an English rock band
 The Verve E.P., a 1992 EP by The Verve
 Verve (R. Stevie Moore album)
 Verve Records, an American jazz record label

Businesses
 Verve Coffee Roasters, an American coffee house chain
 Verve Energy, a corporation owned by the Government of Western Australia
 Verve International, a payment card brand
 Ford Verve concepts, a series of small car concepts from Ford of Europe

Other uses
 Verve (French magazine), an art magazine
 Verve (Indian magazine), a luxury-lifestyle magazine
 Verve (operating system), an operating system by Microsoft Research
 VRV (streaming service), pronounced verve